Hani Saied (born 3 June 1983) is an Egyptian footballer. He currently plays as a defender for Gomhoreyat Shepin.

Career
Saied joined Zamalek from El-Masry in August 2011.

Honours
Haras El-Hodood
Egypt Cup (2): 2009, 2010
Egyptian Super Cup (1): 2009

Zamalek SC
Egypt Cup (1): 2014

References

1983 births
Living people
Sportspeople from Giza
Association football defenders
Egyptian footballers
Egyptian Premier League players
Al Masry SC players
Zamalek SC players
Al Ittihad Alexandria Club players
El Dakhleya SC players
21st-century Egyptian people